Mohnyin Thado (1379–1439) was king of Ava from 1426 to 1439. He is also known in Burmese history as Mohnyin Min Taya (မိုးညှင်း မင်းတရား, "Righteous Lord of Mohnyin") after his longtime tenure as the sawbwa of Mohnyin, a Shan-speaking frontier state (in present-day Kachin State, Myanmar). He founded the royal house (or dynasty) of Mohnyin (မိုးညှင်း ဆက်) that would rule the kingdom until 1527.

Born into minor nobility, Thado began his career as a royal army commander in 1401 during the Forty Years' War against Hanthawaddy Pegu. After making his name under the command of Crown Prince Minye Kyawswa, including the 1406 conquest of Arakan, Thado was appointed sawbwa of Mohnyin in 1410 by King Minkhaung I. After surviving the Chinese incursions of 1412–1415, the sawbwa's influence in the northern Shan states grew over the next decade. He remained loyal to Minkhaung's successor King Thihathu, serving as a co-commander-in-chief alongside Prince Min Nyo of Kale in the successful final campaign of the Forty Years' War in 1422–1423. When Nyo seized the Ava throne with the help of Queen Shin Bo-Me in 1425, Thado was the only vassal to openly challenge the usurping couple; he drove them out of Ava (Inwa) in 1426.

However, Thado himself was viewed as a usurper by many vassals, and could not find any support outside the Irrawaddy valley. He faced a pesky rebellion by Prince Minye Kyawhtin of the previous dynasty from the outset, and by 1427, multiple rebellions had sprung up in the peripheral regions, including his home base, Mohnyin. By 1429, he had largely given up on the reunification project, and began spending much of the royal treasury on a series of constructions of religious buildings. He was unprepared when his internal and external rivals took advantage of his inward-looking policy. He lost the irrigated Yamethin region to the rebel state of Toungoo (Taungoo) in 1429–1430; was forced to cede Tharrawaddy and Paungde to King Binnya Ran I of Hanthawaddy in 1431 after a brief war; and did nothing when Ran seized control of Toungoo in 1436. He grew increasingly eccentric in his last years, and despite the advice of his court, reset the Burmese calendar to year 2 in 1438.

Although he never had any control over the peripheral regions, he did leave his successors with the most productive regions of the kingdom. His immediate successors—Minye Kyawswa I and Narapati I—would use the resources of the core regions to successfully reunify the kingdom in the following decade. His line would lead Ava to its "apogee" in the second half of the 15th century.

Early life

Both his parents—Saw Diga of Mye-Ne and Saw Pale of Nyaungyan—were descended from King Kyawswa I of Pinya (r. 1344–1350), and ultimately from the Pagan and Pinya royal lines, as did the then reigning monarch Swa Saw Ke of Ava. Nansi had two younger siblings, a brother and a sister.

His family apparently had close enough ties with King Swa. The king gave Nansi Inbe, a village 80km northwest of Ava, as an appanage along with the title of Udein (ဥဒိန်, Pali: Udinna). According to the chronicles Maha Yazawin and Hmannan Yazawin, when he was a young boy, Udein briefly served as a page of the king's younger sons, Min Swe and Theiddat, during the princes' years-long tour around the kingdom but left the job shortly after as he could not handle the life on the road. The Yazawin Thit chronicle dismisses the story, pointing out that he was still too young to have been a page during the period (1381–1385) when the princes toured the country.

Udein was nonetheless one of Min Swe's loyalists in 1400 when the prince ascended the throne with the regnal title of Minkhaung. The new king, who faced several challenges to his rule at the start of his reign, appointed Udein governor of Myohla (present-day Shwebo), near Inbe, with an upgraded title of Thado.

Early career

Thado was one of the few loyal vassals the king could count on when King Razadarit of Hanthawaddy Pegu invaded Ava in 1401. He made his name as a royal army commander in 1402 by leading a successful mission to supply the besieged city of Prome (Pyay). His regiment guarding a convoy of 2000 pack ponies, each carrying two tins (~82 liters, ~2.25 bushels) of rice, successfully broke through the Hanthawaddy lines to supply the starving city, helping Prome hold out for the rainy season.

His career continued to rise in the following years. In 1406, he was the second-in-command (sitke) of the Ava invasion army (10,000 men, 500 cavalry, 40 elephants) led by Minkhaung's eldest son Prince Minye Kyawswa that captured the western kingdom of Arakan (present-day Rakhine State). In 1408, after Hanthawaddy had renewed the Forty Years' War, Thado was a member of the senior Ava delegation that tried unsuccessfully to negotiate a truce.

In March 1410, King Minkhaung appointed Thado sawbwa (governor general) of Mohnyin, a major Shan-speaking state (in present-day central Kachin State) near the Chinese border. The appointment came after Minkhaung's lengthy deliberation with his Chief Minister Min Yaza as to how best to deal with the kingdom's rapidly deteriorating relations with China. As a parting gift, the king also gave one of his queens, Shin Myat Hla, in marriage to Thado. For his part, Thado recognized the significance of, and the risk associated with the appointment; he sought out governing advice from Min Yaza before departing for the northern state.

Sawbwa of Mohnyin
Thado would spend the next 16 years in Mohnyin, and use his northern base to take over the Ava throne itself in 1426. His successful rule at Mohnyin earned him the monikers Mohnyin Thado (lit. "Thado of Mohnyin"), and Mohnyin Min Taya (lit. "Righteous Lord of Mohnyin") the names by which he is best known in Burmese history.

Chinese incursions (1412–1415)

Thado's main assignment was to serve as Ava's defense in the north. From the outset, he faced two problems: China, and the restive frontier province itself. Consisted of 19 maings (districts), Mohnyin was historically the most powerful of the Shan states that ringed the entire northern-to-eastern arc of the Ava Kingdom. At times, it even controlled other Shan states including Mogaung and Kale (Kalay), and had periodically raided the lowland states (Ava and its predecessors Sagaing and Pinya) since the 1350s. It was only in 1406 that the powerful state fell under Ava's control. While keeping order in Mohnyin was a challenge in its own right, a more immediate, pressing problem for Ava was China. Claiming that the Shan states which Ava took over in 1405–1406 were its tributaries, the Ming court had demanded Ava to end its "aggression" in the Shan states since 1406, and had considered military action against Ava since 1409. It had also sided with Hanthawaddy, recognizing the Mon-speaking kingdom as its tributary.

Yet Ava did not fully appreciate the extent of the worsening situation. Aside from posting Thado at Mohnyin, the Ava court continued to prioritize the ongoing war effort against Hanthawaddy in the south, sending down conscripts from Chinese border states like Onbaung and Nyaungshwe as late as 1410–1412. It turned out that Thado's regiment at Mohnyin was not enough to defend other northern and eastern districts. When the Chinese vassal Hsenwi invaded northeastern districts of Ava in 1412, Thado and other northern sawbwas had to hunker down until Minye Kyawswa arrived from the Arakan theater with an army. Thado's Mohnyin regiment was part of Minye Kyawswa's 7000-strong army that stopped the Hsenwi army at Wetwin (present-day Pyin Oo Lwin). Minye Kyawswa, Prince Min Nyo and Gov. Thado fought the top Hsenwi commanders—the sawbwa of Hsenwi, alongside his son and son-in-law—on their respective war elephants, and that Hsenwi forces retreated after their sawbwa was killed in combat. The Ava army went on to lay siege to Hsenwi for the next five months, and after the rainy season,  defeated a Chinese relief force (20,000 men and 2000 cavalry) outside Hsenwi. According to the historian G.E. Harvey, Thado was one of Minye Kyawswa's "best captains".

The Hsenwi campaign turned out to be the highlight of Thado's performance in the war. He and other northern governors were again left to fend for themselves after Minye Kyawswa was reassigned to the southern front in late 1412. When the Chinese army returned in early 1413, Thado held out at Mohnyin but other less fortified towns were thoroughly rampaged by the Chinese. (According to the Ming Shilu, the Chinese destroyed over 20 cities and stockades, and brought back elephants, horses, and other goods, which were presented at the Chinese capital in September 1413.) It took Minye Kyawswa's return to drive out the Chinese-backed forces to the border in 1413–1414. Ava's northern defenses finally stopped the Chinese in 1414–1415 but the star of the campaign, according to the chronicles, was Smin Bayan, a former Hanthawaddy commander.

Post-war period to Ava succession crisis (1415–1425)
Although the Chinese incursions ended after 1415, with no formal peace treaty signed, Thado remained posted at Mohnyin for another decade. When the king died in 1421, Thado had emerged as one of the major sawbwas in the north, and his support was courted by Thihathu, the successor to the Ava throne. As a gesture of loyalty, Thado sent his eight-year-old middle son Nawrahta to be a page of the new king. Thihathu in turn, also in a symbolic gesture, gave the youngster the fief of Inbe, which was also Thado's former fief.

Their relationship was further cemented in 1422–1423 when Thado co-led a successful campaign against Hanthawaddy. The campaign was an attempt by Thihathu to take advantage of the succession crisis in the southern kingdom. Thado commanded the main army (8000 troops, 500 cavalry, 30 war elephants) while Prince Min Nyo of Kale commanded the naval invasion force (6000 troops, 700 war boats, 200 cargo boats). The campaign was a success. The combined forces captured the entire Irrawaddy delta, and forced Prince Binnya Ran, the main pretender to the Pegu throne, to propose a peace treaty with terms favorable to Ava, including a marriage alliance between Thihathu and Princess Shin Saw Pu, Ran's sister. Thihathu accepted the proposal, and signed the treaty in 1423.

After the successful campaign, Thado's influence grew unchecked in the north. He faced little oversight from the king, who according to the chronicles spent most of his time with Shin Saw Pu and his concubines, and did little governing. The sawbwa was well established in the north when Thihathu was assassinated in August 1425. (The assassination was carried out by the men of Gov. Le Than Bwa of Onbaung, and arranged by Queen Shin Bo-Me, Thihathu's second-ranked queen, who wanted to place her lover Prince Min Nyo on the throne.) He nominally acknowledged Thihathu's eight-year-old son and successor Min Hla, but began openly conducting his own policy. Although it is unclear if he had the legal authority to do so, Thado appointed his middle son Nawrahta, who had escaped Thihathu's assassination, as sawbwa of Wuntho.

Successful revolt (1425–1426)
His full break with Ava came in November 1425 when the Bo-Me faction assassinated the boy king, and placed Prince Nyo on the throne. The power grab was seen by many vassal rulers as illegitimate. Although the prince had a strong claim to the throne as the only son of King Tarabya of Ava (r. 1400), he received only lukewarm support from the vassals close to the capital. In the north, where Thado held sway, only Le Than Bwa of Onbaung and Baya Gamani of Singu backed Nyo, while in the south, Gov. Min Maha of Prome, a major vassal state, did not acknowledge Nyo. Still, Thado was the only vassal that would attempt to oust Nyo. Over the next three months, Thado went on to secure the support of most of the northern Shan states, including that of the powerful state of Mogaung. His authority now reached as far south as the northern Mu valley, one of the three main irrigated regions of Ava, although Nyo had not yet conceded the region.

His drive south began in February 1426. His forces faced the Ava defenses led by Gov. Thray Sithu of Myinsaing, and Gov. Le Than Bwa of Onbaung. Thado's strategy was to march at a "slow, methodical, and deliberate" pace, so as to allow Nyo's unenthusiastic vassals to desert him. Even when his vanguard forces scored a surprisingly quick victory at Thissein, Thado paused the advance to recruit more troops from the region. In April, his enlarged forces defeated the 3000-man garrison at Wetchet, knocking Thray Sithu out of the war. 

The victory opened the way to Sagaing, across the Irrawaddy from Ava. Here, Thado persuaded the commander of the Sagaing garrison, Le Than Bwa, to leave the fight by giving the sawbwa a substantial amount of gold and silver. Le Than Bwa's departure created a panic across the river. All but one of the vassals guarding the perimeter around the capital renounced their ties to Nyo, and withdrew to their home regions. King Nyo and Queen Bo-Me subsequently fled the capital, and Thado entered the capital unopposed on 16 May 1426.

Reign

Accession

Thado formally ascended the throne on 20 May 1426 with the regnal title of Thiri Tri-Bawana-Ditya-Pawara-Pandita Dhamma-Yaza (သီရိ တြိဘဝနာဒိတျပဝရပဏ္ဍိတ ဓမ္မရာဇာ). He appointed his 15-year-old eldest son einshei min (heir apparent) with the title of Minye Kyawswa. His coronation is notable for the animist practices of his soldiers, who celebrated by sacrificing horses and cattle to the Mahagiri spirit.

The 46-year-old had seized the throne although the most senior princes in the line of succession—Tarabya and Minye Kyawhtin, had not given up their claim. Nor had he secured the support of the southern and eastern vassals, who considered him "at best a senior".

Consolidation of power
His initial targets were the royals with the highest claim to the throne. His troops chased King Nyo and Queen Bo-Me, and Nyo died on the run about two weeks later. Queen Bo-Me, despite her contempt for Thado, became one of his queens.

His next targets were princes Tarabya and Minye Kyawhtin, who were holding out in Pakhan, about 100km southwest of Ava. Over the next two months, Thado went on to secure the support of the vassals along the Irrawaddy—Pagan (Bagan), Sale, Sagu, Pakhan Nge, Salin and Prome (Pyay). In August, his forces (9000 troops, 300 cavalry and 20 elephants) easily overran Pakhan, and captured both princes as well as Shin Saw Pu, a consort of Tarabya and a former queen of King Thihathu. Thado raised Pu to be his queen, and then made a fateful decision to pardon the princes, the only living son and grandson of his deceased lord, King Minkhaung. He sent Tarabya to live in an estate in Pagan, and Minye Kyawhtin to Thissein.

Next, he summoned the two main Southeastern governors, Gov. Thinkhaya III of Toungoo and Gov. Thihapate III of Taungdwin to Ava. When the governors reluctantly showed up, he wooed them by presenting lavish gifts, and treating them with respect. While the governors politely pledged allegiance to the new king, Thado's eldest son, the crown prince, was skeptical, and urged his father not to allow them to return to their fiefs. Thado dismissed his son's advice.

Start of rebellions and Pegu's shadow war
It soon turned out that the son's suspicion was correct. The two governors declared independence soon after they got back to their fiefs. By early 1427, Thado's regime was beset by a new round of rebellions: Onbaung and Mohnyin (his former fief) in the north, and Toungoo and Taungdwin in the south.

What triggered the next round was the rebellion by Prince Minye Kyawhtin, whose life was spared by Thado earlier in August. Unlike his uncle Tarabya, the prince, the eldest son of Crown Prince Minye Kyawswa (r. 1406–1415), refused to relinquish his claim to the throne. He promptly left Thissein for Onbaung where he received Le Than Bwa's backing. In late 1426, the prince and his Onbaung army invaded, reaching Yenantha, about 60 km northeast of the capital. Although Thado's main army managed to drive back Kyawhtin, the battle so close to the capital proved to be the opening for unenthusiastic vassals. In January 1427, the sawbwa of Mogaung revolted after being passed over for the governorship of Mohnyin, and seized Mohnyin. Meanwhile, the governors of Toungoo and Taungdwin had not only revolted but also enlisted the support of King Binnya Ran I of Hanthawaddy Pegu to seize Prome (Pyay). Hanthawaddy forces went on to occupy Tharrawaddy, the southernmost district of Prome.

Weak response to rebellions

Thado was ill-prepared to take on the rebellions simultaneously. He considered the defense of Prome his top priority, and deployed most of his forces in the south. But he was completely caught off guard when Kyawhtin invaded again in the next dry season. The rebel prince advanced as far as Tabetswe, just 25 km southeast of Ava. Thado had to scramble to raise a force, which could only push Kyawhtin back to Pinle, about 70 km southeast of Ava.

After the close call, Thado pursued a largely defensive policy. Aside from sending a small, unsuccessful, expedition to Pinle in the 1428–1429 dry season, he posted his forces in defensive positions at the southern and northern frontiers, appointing his second son governor of Prome, and his younger brother governor of Myedu in 1429. The appointments came soon after Queen Shin Saw Pu had managed to flee Ava, and returned to Pegu. Pu's return cleared the way for her brother Ran to press on to Prome but Thado was oblivious to the threat. He was focused on building a large Buddhist stupa for the relics brought back from Ceylon by two senior monks from Ava. (Earlier in the year, King Binnya Ran personally accompanied the monks, who had landed at Bassein (Pathein), to Prome, where the relics were transferred to forty boats sent from Ava with great fanfare.)

Thado's rivals viewed his inaction as weakness, and would soon test him. Later that year, Toungoo forces marched north, and occupied the Yamethin region with five irrigated districts. Despite still controlling Upper Burma's three main granaries—Mu valley, Minbu and a large portion of Kyaukse—Thado did not respond forcefully. His attention was largely focused on building his pagoda, the Yadana Zedi in Sagaing. Instead, upon the recommendation of his court, he sent two separate missions to Onbaung and Yat Sauk Naung Mun, asking Onbaung to withdraw its support of Kyawhtin at Pinle, and Yat Sauk to end its support of Thinkhaya at Toungoo, in exchange for Ava's recognition of the Shan-speaking states. Both missions failed to secure a deal. An emboldened Thinkhaya of Toungoo now planned an outright seizure of Prome, and went on to secure military assistance from Pegu.

War with Hanthawaddy (1430–1431)

In October 1430, Pegu and Toungoo launched a joint invasion of Prome. The 15,000-strong combined forces quickly laid siege to the fortified port city on the Irrawaddy. Thado, who had devoted much of his resources on building his pagoda for the past year, was caught off guard. His court advised him that he did not have enough troops to break the siege in the south, and to defend the capital region from Pinle at the same time. He reluctantly agreed to negotiate directly with Ran, monarch-to-monarch, on the condition that Thinkhaya not be part of the negotiation.

But when the Hanthawaddy delegation showed up, Thado was shocked by Ran's demands. The Hanthawaddy king had asked Thado to acknowledge his 1427 annexation of Tharrawaddy and Paungde. Thado was so angry at the demand that he reflexively ordered the head of the Hanthawaddy delegation, Maha Thamun, executed before his Chief Minister Yazathingyan talked him out of it. He kept the delegation waiting for another three months, and continued on with the pagoda construction to its completion on 27 January 1431.

Only after the pagoda completion ceremony did he turn his attention to the war. Prome was still under siege, albeit in a ceasefire. He had raised 13,000 troops in the three months but in the end, he decided not to fight, and largely agreed to Ran's initial terms. When he and Ran met outside Prome, he formally ceded Tharrawaddy and Paungde, and sent Princess Soe Min Wimala Dewi, a niece of the late King Minkhaung I of Ava, to Ran, in a marriage of state. (She became Ran's chief queen, and their only son Leik Munhtaw later became king of Pegu in 1453.) The only concession by Ran was to withdraw his support of Toungoo.

Withdrawal from governing

Thado, however, did not make use of Ran's concession to reclaim Toungoo. Instead, he became more reclusive. He resumed constructing more temples, directing much of his rump kingdom's resources to several construction projects. In all, he would build a total of 27 new pagodas, temples and monasteries, including one at Rajagaha (ရာဇဂြိုဟ်) in India during his reign. According to a preliminary calculation by the historian Michael Aung-Thwin, the 27 projects may have cost the royal treasury 1.62 million kyats (ticals) (25,453 kg) of silver, "not including the usual endowments of people and land for their subsequent upkeep."

Reunifying the kingdom was no longer his top priority. In all, in the last 8 years of his reign, he authorized only one minor expedition: a 1433–1434 campaign led by his eldest son the crown prince to Pinle, Yamethin and Taungdwin. However, the army's strength (5000 troops, 300 cavalry, 12 elephants) was too small to capture the heavily fortified towns, spread over 70km to 250 km away from Ava. The army returned empty handed after three months.

The king would send no more expeditions. He did nothing when Thinkhaya of Toungoo died in 1435, and a power struggle broke out between Thinkhaya's son-in-law Uzana and son Saw Oo. He did nothing in 1436 when Binnya Ran, in breach of the 1431 treaty, openly marched to Toungoo with an army, and placed Saw Oo on the Toungoo throne.

Recalibration of the calendar

Thado's eccentricity only grew in his last years. By 1437, he had come to believe in the advice of court astrologers that his rump kingdom's troubles needed to be addressed by recalibrating the Burmese calendar when it reached the year 800 ME (in 1438 CE). Aghast, the court tried to dissuade him. When told by Chief Minister Yazathingyan that kings who altered the calendar died within the year, he replied: "I could not be afraid of death, if it meant making all creatures happy. If I must die, let me die. I will not be put into a song as the king who was afraid to do his duty."

On the eleventh anniversary of his coronation, on 18 May 1437, he announced at the Ava Palace that the calendar would reset to year two (not year zero), on the next new year's day (30 March 1438).

Death and succession
Thado did not die within the year of recalibration as some had prophesied. He died within 13 months, days before the 13th anniversary of his reign—in April 1439. He apparently had believed in the prophecy, nonetheless. The chronicles say that he spent his last months performing merit-making deeds, including granting amnesty to those arrested for larceny, marrying off his concubines that were caught cheating to their lovers, bequeathing assets to his queens and concubines, and freeing prostitutes in Ava, Pagan and Nyaung-U by paying off their debts. He was 59.

The king was succeeded by his eldest son Crown Prince Minye Kyawswa.

Legacy

Although his reign was largely ineffectual, the former sawbwa of a northern peripheral state had founded a new dynasty (or a new house of the founding dynasty) based out of Ava. The House/Dynasty of Mohnyin (မိုးညှင်း ဆက်) would lead Ava to its "apogee" in the second half of the 15th century, and rule the kingdom until 1527.

However the success of the dynasty was mainly due to the competence of his successors. In all, Thado "left many religious edifices but also political opposition." His main contribution was in leaving his successors with a relatively peaceful core region that included the most productive granaries, Mu valley, Minbu and a large portion of Kyaukse. Whereas he chose to devote the wealth and manpower of the core region on temple building, the core regions provided enough resources for his immediate successors to reunify the kingdom. Indeed, his sons kings Minye Kyawswa I (r. 1439–1442) and Narapati I (r. 1442–1468) both pursued a more militaristic policy, and recovered all of the former vassals of Ava, including those lost to Hanthawaddy, by the late 1440s.

His recalibration of the calendar did not succeed. The new era, known as Thekkarit To (သက္ကရာဇ် တို, "Short Era"), never gained popular use. The Ava court did continue to use Thekkarit To alongside the existing era at least until 1496/97 in the reign of King Minkhaung II (r. 1480–1501).

Administration

Extent of his realm
His authority extended only along the narrow north-south axis of the Irrawaddy river. His southernmost garrison was in Prome (Pyay), ~400 km south of Ava while his northernmost garrison was in Myedu, ~200 km from the capital. (He might have had intermittent control further north to Myohla near Mohnyin and Bhamo.) He never had any control of the eastern (e.g., Onbaung and Nyaungshwe) and southeastern states (Toungoo and Taungdwin). Indeed, he did not even control Pinle, just 70 km from Ava. This narrowness is corroborated by the 27 pagodas/monasteries he built during his reign: most were located within the Myedu–Prome corridor, revealing "the extent, at least, of the areas under Ava's direct rule."

Vassal rulers
Thado appointed many of his closest kin to rule the key regions of his rump kingdom. Outside of Yazathingyan, his Chief Minister, and Baya Gamani of Singu, the rulers of the key states were his close relatives. Myedu in the north was ruled by his younger brother Nawrahta, who also commanded the Northern Cavalry (မြောက်ဖက်မြင်း). Prome in the south was ruled by his middle son Thihathu.

Military service
The following is a list of military campaigns Thado participated in as a commander or general, as reported in the royal chronicles. The campaigns he ordered but did not to go to the front are not included.

Historiography
Chronicles do not agree on the key dates of his life and reign. All major chronicles say he was born on a Sunday in 1379. The chronicle Zatadawbon Yazawin provides conflicting information in two sections.

Family

Ancestry
He was a seventh generation descendant of kings Naratheinkha and Sithu II of Pagan, and a great grandson of Kyawswa I of Pinya. He was also a descendant of Chief Minister Yazathingyan of Pagan through his great-great grandmother Khin Hpone, who was a daughter of Gen. Yanda Pyissi, the younger son of Yazathingyan.

Siblings
The eldest child, Thado had a younger brother and a younger sister.

Consorts
According to the Maha Yazawin, Thado had just one senior queen (mibaya), and did not formally keep queens of northern, central and western palaces. However, later chronicles, the Yazawin Thit and the Hmannan Yazawin include Shin Bo-Me, Shin Saw Pu and Shin Hla Myat as other senior queens.

Issue
He had five children, four of which by his chief queen, and one by a concubine.

Notes

References

Bibliography
 
 
 
 
 
 
 
 
 
 
 
 
 
 
 
 
 
 
 
 
 

Ava dynasty
1379 births
1439 deaths
15th-century Burmese monarchs